SC 129 was a North Atlantic convoy of the SC series which ran during the Battle of the Atlantic in World War II. It was one of several convoy battles that occurred during the crisis month of May 1943.

Background
SC 129 was an east bound convoy of 25 ships, plus local contingents, which sailed from New York on 2 May 1943 bound for Liverpool and carrying war materials.

Mid-Ocean Escort Force group B2 joined the convoy from St. John's, Newfoundland and Labrador on 6 May. Escort group B2 was led by Cdr D MacIntyre in HMS Hesperus; other ships of this group were destroyer  and five corvettes. They were joined for the voyage by two armed trawlers, plus a convoy rescue ship and an oiler.

Arrayed against them in the North Atlantic were  patrol lines Rhein, Elbe and Drossel, though although in the event only Elbe, re-configured and comprising 21 U-boats, engaged SC 129.

Action
First contact with the convoy was made on 11 May by U-504, which called up other boats from Elbe and commenced shadowing. The radio activity alerted the Admiralty to the threat, and they ordered Support Group 5, comprising escort carrier HMS Biter and four destroyers to join. At that time SG 5 was supporting HX 237, under attack by boats from Rhein and Drossel, but was then in range of Coastal Command aircraft, and it was decided SC 129 was in more need.

The report by U-504 had brought up about a dozen U-boats, and on the evening of 11 May one of these, U-402, slipped past the escorts and torpedoed two ships. These  were the freighter Antigone, and the Norwegian freighter Grado. Both ships sank, Antigone with the loss of three of her crew. MacIntyre was, in his own words, "furious" that  ships under his group's protection had been sunk; in the previous nine months they had escorted tens of convoys without loss. Later that night HMS Hesperus got a contact with U-223 and attacked; by depth charge and ramming. U-223 was also so badly damaged she was forced  to retire.

On returning to the convoy HMS Hesperus found another U-boat in the early hours of 12 May. This was U-186, tracking the convoy. HMS Hesperus quickly closed in, and as the U-boat crash-dived, attacked with depth charges. This time the boat was destroyed, all hands were lost.

During 12 May the assembled U-boats made over a dozen separate attempts to penetrate the escort screen, but an aggressive defence by the warships, despite being low on fuel and ammunition, prevented any losses.

On 13 May the convoy was joined by HMS Biter and her group; HMS Hesperus and her group were able to re-fuel and re-arm, and HMS Biter was able to mount continuous air patrols. At this BdU saw there was nothing to be achieved, and the attack by the Elbe boats was called off, though they continued to shadow. On 17 May this too was abandoned, and Elbe was disbanded.

During this period, one of the Drossel boats, U-607, encountered a neutral Irish freighter, Irish Oak, on 15 May and despite her clear markings torpedoed her.
The incident caused a political controversy in Ireland, as there were allegations that Irish Oak had warned the convoy of the presence of U-boats: This was firmly rejected by her owners and the Irish government. The U-boat commander received a mild reprimand.

SC 129 arrived without further incident in Liverpool on 22 May 1943.

Aftermath
SC 129 was a success for the Allies. Despite the loss of two ships, 23 ships had arrived safely. Added to this, an attack by a wolfpack of 12 U-boats had been beaten off, one U-boat had been destroyed, and two more so badly damaged they had to return to base. The convoy was another in a series of set-backs suffered by the U-boat Arm collectively known as Black May.

Tables
Allied ships lost

U-boats destroyed

U-boats damaged

Notes

References
 Clay Blair : Hitler's U-Boat War [Volume 2]: The Hunted 1942–1945 (1998)  (2000 UK paperback ed.)
 Arnold Hague : The Allied Convoy System 1939–1945 (2000)  (Canada).  (UK)
 Paul Kemp  : U-Boats Destroyed ( 1997) 
 Donald Macintyre: U-Boat Killer (1956) ISBN (none)
 Axel Neistle  : German U-Boat Losses during World War II  (1998)

External links
   SC 129 at convoyweb.org
 SC 129 at warsailors.com
  SC 129 at uboat.net

SC129
Naval battles of World War II involving Canada
C